Nick Swinmurn is the founder of Zappos.com. He started the company in 1999. He left in 2006, before it reached $1 billion sales in 2008, and was sold to Amazon in 2009.

Early life and education
Swinmurn was born in England and moved to the United States at the age of seven, growing up in the Bay Area of California. His father was an engineer and his mother was a teacher.  He graduated from Los Altos High School and proceeded to earn a degree in Film Studies from the University of California, Santa Barbara in 1995. After college, Swinmurn initially worked in ticket sales for the San Bernardino Stampede minor-league baseball team and then for the San Diego Padres.  He then returned to northern California and worked at Autoweb.com, saying he was inspired by the 'anything is possible' attitude of the founders. He left Autoweb in 1998 and considered other options such as running a portal for students before finally deciding to start Zappos.com.  Swinmurn worked as a contractor for Silicon Graphics in order to raise funds for an online shoe store, initially called Shoesite.com.  He started Zappos in 1999.

Swinmurn left Zappos in 2006. He has started a number of companies since, some successful and others not. He also founded Dethrone Royalty, which is now owned by his brother Dan and caters to fans of Mixed Martial Arts.

Sports team ownerships
Swinmurn is a member of the Golden State Warriors ownership group. He also owned the Burlingame Dragons FC.

References

External links
 Dethrone Royalty
 Zappos.com
 BBC interview
 IdeaMensch interview

Living people
American businesspeople
University of California, Santa Barbara alumni
Year of birth missing (living people)
American online retailer founders